The 1984 Cal Poly Mustangs football team represented California Polytechnic State University during the 1984 NCAA Division II football season.

Cal Poly competed in the Western Football Conference (WFC). The Mustangs were led by third-year head coach Jim Sanderson and played home games at Mustang Stadium in San Luis Obispo, California. They finished the season with a record of six wins and four losses (6–4, 2–1 WFC). Overall, the team outscored its opponents 197–90 for the season.

Schedule

Team players in the NFL
The following Cal Poly Mustang players were selected in the 1985 NFL Draft.

Notes

References

Cal Poly
Cal Poly Mustangs football seasons
Cal Poly Mustangs football